Dean Edward Martin (born 31 August 1972) is an English football coach and former player who coaches Selfoss. A midfielder, he spent much of his playing career in Iceland with KA and ÍA and also played in England, Hong Kong and the Republic of Ireland. He moved into coaching and management whilst still a player and has held senior and youth roles with club and international teams in Iceland.

Playing career

Early years 
A midfielder, Martin began his career in Sunday League football, before moving to Conference club Fisher Athletic. He returned to First Division club West Ham United, with whom he had spent a period as a youth, for a £25,000 fee in May 1991. Martin made three appearances during the second half of the 1991–92 season, which would be his only for the club. He spent the opening month of 1993 on loan at Third Division club Colchester United and was released by the Hammers to join Conference club Kettering Town in September 1993, where he remained until 1995.

Iceland 
Martin moved to Iceland to join 1. deild karla club KA in 1995. Martin's Icelandic career stretched from 1995 to 2014 and he played in the top two divisions, principally for KA and ÍA. He won a promotion from the 1. deild karla with each club and played European football for both. Martin retired at age 42, after spending the 2014 Úrvalsdeild season with ÍBV.

Football nomad 
Between 1995 and 2001, Martin spent the autumn and winter months playing for clubs outside Iceland. He returned to England to play for Brentford (1995–96), Hereford United (1998–99) and Stevenage Borough during the 1999–00 and 2000–01 seasons. He also played in Hong Kong for Eastern AA and Hong Kong Rangers and in the Republic of Ireland for Bohemians.

Managerial and coaching career 
Martin completed his KSÍ 'A' coaching badges in 2009 and has a BSc in Sports Science from Reykjavík University. He has held management roles at KA, Breiðablik U19 and HK U19. He has worked as an assistant manager at club sides ÍA, ÍBV and HK. On 26 September 2018, Martin was appointed as manager of newly-relegated 2. deild karla club Selfoss on a two-year contract.

Martin has assisted and coached Iceland at youth level and in January 2017 was appointed the KSÍ's head of talent identification. He departed his roles to become assistant manager of China Women in November 2017, but left the setup after manager Sigurður Ragnar Eyjólfsson was sacked in May 2018.

Career statistics

Honours 
ÍA
 1. deild karla: 2011

KA
 1. deild karla second-place promotion: 2001

References

External links

1972 births
Living people
Footballers from Islington (district)
Association football midfielders
English footballers
Fisher Athletic F.C. players
West Ham United F.C. players
Colchester United F.C. players
Kettering Town F.C. players
Knattspyrnufélag Akureyrar players
Knattspyrnufélag Akureyrar managers
Brentford F.C. players
Eastern Sports Club footballers
Hong Kong Rangers FC players
Dean Martin
Bohemian F.C. players
Hereford United F.C. players
Stevenage F.C. players
Dean Martin
English Football League players
League of Ireland players
English expatriate sportspeople in Iceland
Expatriate footballers in Hong Kong
Expatriate footballers in Iceland
1. deild karla players
Úrvalsdeild karla (football) managers
National League (English football) players
Hong Kong First Division League players
English expatriate sportspeople in Ireland
English expatriate footballers
English expatriate football managers
British expatriates in China
English football managers
Player-coaches
Reykjavík University alumni
English expatriate sportspeople in Hong Kong